Cyriocosmus elegans is a spider species in the genus Cyriocosmus and the family Theraphosidae (tarantulas) found in Venezuela, Trinidad and Tobago.

Basic Information
Cyriocosmus elegans is a fossorial species of tarantula that is known to reach maturity quickly, sometimes in a year's time.  Adult size is around 1.5" to 2" diagonal leg span (DLS), from leg I on one side to leg IV on the opposite side. Second instar spiderlings are around 1/16" to 1/8" DLS and will readily accept pre-killed feeders, fruit flies, or even a cricket leg.

Climate of Habitat1
Trinidad and Tobago

See also
 List of Theraphosidae species

References

1"Trinidad And Tobago, Temperature, Average Weather History, Rainfall/ Precipitation, Sunshine." World Weather and Climate Graphs, Average Climate Charts, Guide to Precipitation, Temperatures, Best, Friendly, Holiday Climate. Web. 29 Nov. 2010. <http://www.trinidad-and-tobago.climatemps.com/>.

External links

 Cyriocosmus elegans on flickr
 Cyriocosmus elegans on Encyclopedia of Life

Theraphosidae
Spiders described in 1889
Spiders of South America